Dr. Pasupathy is a 1990 Indian Malayalam-language comedy drama film directed by Shaji Kailas, written by Renji Panicker. The film stars Innocent in the titular role along with, Rizabawa, Parvathy, Nedumudi Venu, Jagathy Sreekumar, Kuthiravattom Pappu, Jagadish, KPAC Lalitha, Kalpana in supporting roles. The film follows Bhairavan, a con artist who is hired by the Panchayat leader of a small village to pose as a veterinary doctor.

This film was produced and distributed by V. C. George under the banner of Saga Films, in his second production venture after the 1989 cult classic Dasharatham. The film features original songs composed by Johnson. The cinematography was done by Watson D'Cruz. M. G. Soman appeared in a cameo role as the narrator of the film. The film marked the onscreen debut of actor Rizabawa.

The film was released on 4 May 1990 and was a box office success. The film is noted for being directed by Kailas, who later became known for his political thrillers. The film is written by Renji Panicker, who went on to collaborate with Kailas in many films. The character UDC Kumari played by Kalpana is considered one of the best comedy characters in Malayalam cinema and eventually developed a cult following several years after the release of the film.

Plot 
The comical film introduces us to a small village and its funny characters. The narrator informs of its developments and day-to-day activities. Soon, it slowly focus to the problems discussed in the Panchayat office (fights do occur between two factions in a comical way), in which the main problem is the absence of a veterinary doctor. The leaders of the opposition faction, Nanappan and Uthpalakshan, gives a final ultimatum to the Panchayat president Unnikannan Nair to resign his post if he can't find a vet within days.

Unnikannan Nair's daughter Ammukutty falls love with Pappen. However Unnikannan Nair disapproves due to the rivalry of Pappen's friends for The Panchayat President – Nanappan, Uthpalakshan and 'Society' Balan. Also the animosity between Pappan's Grandfather and Kunjulakshmi, Unnikannan Nair's mother adds fun to the tale. The romantic angle includes 'Society' Balan's romance with U. D. C. Kumari who is also followed by Balan's father and Unnikannan Nair's associate Parameswara Kurup.

While Parameswara Kurup travels to find a vet he encounters an old friend and thief, Bhairavan and encourages him to act. Thus Bhairavan is introduced in the village in his new avatar, Dr. Pasupathy. Unnikannan Nair soon takes a liking to him and arranges Ammukutty's marriage. Heartbroken, Pappen soon leaves the village for work and finds solace and shelter from a friend who is Police Circle Inspector.

Soon when Dr. Pasupathy's 'uncle', his associate in fact Velayudhan Kutty, enters the village to see Bhairavan and joins his scam, it's up to Pappen's friends to call back Pappen to save Ammukutty.

Cast 

Innocent as Bhairavan /Doctor Pashupati 
Rizabawa as Pappan
Parvathy as Ammukkutty
Nedumudi Venu as Unnikannan Nair
Paravoor Bharathan as Kurup
Jagathy Sreekumar
Kuthiravattam Pappu as Ulpalakshan 
Jagadish as Society Balan
Paravoor Bharathan
Thikkurisi Sukumaran Nair
Kalpana as UDC Kumari
Meena Joseph as Usha
K.P.A.C. Lalitha as Unnikkannan Nair's wife 
Philomina as Unnikkannan Nair's mother/Muthassi 
Mammukoya as Velayudhan 
Vijayaraghavan as Police Officer 
NL Balakrishnan as Police Constable 
Krishnankutty Nair as Police Constable 
Sainuddin as Tea Shop Owner 
Kunchan

Themes and influences 
This film's main character has failed to achieved masculinity as dictated by societal standards.

Soundtrack 
The film features music by Johnson Master. Rajamani, who composed music for Kailas' News (1989), was present for the recording and re-rerecording for this film and Sunday 7 PM (1990).

"Kanakam Mannil" – M. G. Sreekumar, Sujatha Mohan

Reception 
In a review of the film in early 2022, Silpa Rajan from The Times of India compared the doctor character played by Innocent to Doctor Strange.

Legacy 
The film is well known for its comedic track involving Kalpana's character UDC Kumari. Alphonse Puthren listed this film as one among his fifty favorite Malayalam films.

References

External links 
 

1990 comedy-drama films
1990s Malayalam-language films
Films about con artists
Films directed by Shaji Kailas
Films scored by Johnson
Indian comedy-drama films